The Indian Ballistic Missile Defence Program is an initiative to develop and deploy a multi-layered ballistic missile defence system to protect India from ballistic missile attacks. It was launched in 2000 after Kargil War by the Atal Bihari Vajpayee government. Testing was carried out and continuing , and the system was expected to be operational four years from then according to the head of the country's missiles development programme, Vijay Kumar Saraswat.

Introduced in light of the ballistic missile threat from Pakistan and China, it is a double-tiered system consisting of two land and sea-based interceptor missiles, namely the Prithvi Air Defence (PAD) missile for high altitude interception, and the Advanced Air Defence (AAD) Missile for lower altitude interception. The two-tiered shield should be able to intercept any incoming missile launched from 5,000 kilometres away. The system also includes an overlapping network of early warning and tracking radars, as well as command and control posts.

The PAD was tested in November 2006, followed by the AAD in December 2007. With the test of the PAD missile, India became the fourth country to have successfully developed an anti-ballistic missile system, after United States, Russia, and Israel. The system has undergone several tests but system is yet to be officially commissioned.

As per reports emerged in January 2020, the first phase of BMD program is now complete. The Indian Air Force (IAF) and Defence Research and Development Organisation (DRDO) are awaiting for Government of India approval to install the missile shield around national capital which will take three to four years time for installation post approval.

Background
Since the early 90s, India has faced the threat of ballistic missile attacks from Pakistan against which it has fought multiple wars in the past and also from China. With the heightening of tensions in the region, and in response to Pakistan's deployment of M-11 missiles bought from China, the Indian Government in August 1995 procured six batteries of S-300 Surface-to-air missiles to protect New Delhi and other cities.  In May 1998, India for the second time (since its first test in 1974) tested nuclear weapons (see Pokhran-II), followed by Pakistan (see Chagai-I) with its first-ever nuclear test. With Pakistan's testing of nuclear weapons and missile delivery systems, this threat intensified. India has also developed and tested missile delivery systems during Integrated Guided Missile Development Programme (IGMDP).

In 1999, the Kargil War between India and Pakistan became the first direct conflict between two declared nuclear powers. As the war progressed, the first hint of the possible use of a nuclear weapon was on 31 May, when Pakistani foreign secretary Shamshad Ahmad made a statement warning that an escalation of the limited conflict could lead Pakistan to use "any weapon" in its arsenal. This was immediately interpreted as an obvious threat of a nuclear retaliation by Pakistan in the event of an extended war. The leader of Pakistan's senate noted that "the purpose of developing weapons becomes meaningless if they are not used when they are needed." Some experts believe that following nuclear tests in 1998, Pakistani military was emboldened by its nuclear deterrent cover to markedly increase coercion against India.

Development of an anti-ballistic missile system began in late 1999, suggesting that India initiated the programme in light of Pakistan's eschewing of a nuclear No first use policy and heightened tensions during the Kargil War including a possibility of full-scale nuclear war. Development accelerated after Washington vetoed a bid by India to acquire the Israeli Arrow-2 interceptor in 2002.

Phase-I of the system will enable interception of missiles up to a 2,000-km range, which will be extended to 5,000-km range in Phase-II.

Development

Phase 1

Development of the anti-ballistic missile system began in 1999. Around 40 public and private companies were involved in the development of the systems. They include Ordnance Factory Board, Bharat Electronics Limited and Bharat Dynamics among others.

Defence Research and Development Laboratory (DRDL) developed the mission control software for the AAD missile. Research Centre Imarat (RCI) developed navigation, electromechanical actuation systems and the active radar seeker. Advanced Systems Laboratory (ASL) provided the motors, jet vanes and structures for the AAD and PAD. High Energy Materials Research Laboratory (HEMRL) supplied the propellants for the missile. Research Centre Imarat and Programme Air Defence (PGAD) at Hyderabad are spearheading the Indian Ballistic Missile Defence Programme.

As of April 2019, the Phase-1 of the program has been completed.

Phase 2
Two new anti ballistic missiles that can intercept IRBMs are being developed. The test trials of these two systems were expected to take place in 2011. The new missile will be similar to the Terminal High Altitude Area Defense (THAAD) missile deployed by US.
On 6 May 2012, Dr. V. K. Saraswat confirmed the completion of Phase-I and added that Phase-II was planned to be completed by 2016 to protect against missiles having range up to 5,000 km, and intercept missiles which are capable of hypersonic speeds above Mach 5.

India is also planning to develop a laser based weapon system as part of its defence to intercept and destroy missiles soon after they are launched towards the country. DRDO's Air Defence Programme Director V. K. Saraswat says its ideal to destroy a ballistic missile carrying nuclear or conventional warheads in its boost phase. Saraswat further added that it will take another 10–15 years for the premier defence research institute to make it usable on the ground.

The DRDO Floating Test Range is expected to assist in the development of the Phase 2. This vessel INS Anvesh (A41) was set to undergo sea trials in September 2021. The first successful flight of AD-1 missile was carried out on 2 November 2022. It was designed for endo-atmospheric and low exo-atmospheric interception against missile and, airborne early warning and control aircraft. Propelled by two-stage solid rocket motor and equipped with advanced control system, navigation and guidance algorithm in AD-1 increased the kill altitude bracket. Initially under Phase 2 program, AD-1 was designed to neutralize medium-range ballistic missile at 1,000-3,000 km range, whereas AD-2 was for intercepting intermediate-range ballistic missile at 3,000-5,500 km range. But according to Samir V. Kamat, AD-1 can now intercept incoming missile fired from a distance of 5,000 km.

Components
The deployed system would consist of many launch vehicles, radars, Launch Control Centres (LCC) and the Mission Control Centre (MCC). All these are geographically distributed and connected by a secure communication network.

The MCC is the software intensive component of the ballistic missile defence system. It receives information from various sources such as radars and satellites which is then processed by ten computers which run simultaneously. The MCC is connected to all other elements of the defence through a WAN. MCC performs target classification, target assignment and kill assessment. It also acts as a decision support system for the commander. It can also decide the number of interceptors required for the target for an assured kill probability. After performing all these functions, the MCC assigns the target to the LCC of a launch battery. The LCC starts computing the time to launch the interceptor based upon information received from a radar based on the speed, altitude and flight path of the target. LCC prepares the missile for launch in real time and carries out ground guidance computation.

After the interceptor is launched, it is provided target information from the radar through a datalink. When the interceptors close onto the target missile, it activates the radar seeker to search for the target missile and guides itself to intercept the target. Multiple PAD and AAD interceptors can be launched against a target for high kill probability.

Prithvi Air Defence (PAD) / Pradyumna Ballistic Missile Interceptor 

The Prithvi Air Defence (PAD) is an anti-ballistic missile developed to intercept incoming ballistic missiles outside the atmosphere (exo-atmospheric). The first stage is a Solid fuelled motor while the second stage is Liquid fuelled. It has manoeuvre thrusters which can generate a lateral acceleration of more than 5 gs at  altitude. Guidance is provided by an internal navigation system with mid-course updates from LRTR and active radar homing in the terminal phase. PAD has capability to engage the  class of ballistic missiles at a speed of Mach 5. PAD is fast enough to hit medium-range ballistic missiles and intermediate-range ballistic missiles.

LRTR is the target acquisition and fire control radar for the PAD missile. The PAD missile has also been called Pradyumna.

The improved missile will utilise a gimbaled directional warhead, a technology also used by Israel, the US and Russia. This technology allows for a smaller warhead to destroy the target missile.

The second stage of the PAD uses liquid rocket propellant, which corrodes fuel tanks when stored for long, the PAD could not be on standby 24/7. Instead, it would need to be filled up during a period of crisis in anticipation of trouble. This is less than optimal for a weapon intended to defend against an attack at any moment.

Prithvi Air Defence Exercise
The Prithvi-II ballistic missile was modified successfully to mimic the trajectory of M-11 missiles.

The test will be conducted with a modified Prithvi missile launched from a naval ship and the anti-ballistic missile launched from Wheeler Island. The interception of the target missile will take place at approximately  altitude.

On 6 March 2009 the DRDO carried out a second successful test of the PAD interceptor missile. The target was tracked by Swordfish (LRTR) radar and destroyed by the PAD at  altitude.

On 6 March 2011 DRDO successfully test-fired interceptor missile from Advanced Air Defence (AAD) which destroyed a 'hostile' target ballistic missile, a modified Prithvi, at an altitude of 16 km over the Bay of Bengal. Advanced Air Defence (AAD) missile positioned at Wheeler Island, about 70 km across sea from Chandipur, received signals from tracking radars installed along the coastline and travelled through the sky at a speed of Mach 4.5 to destroy it.

Advanced Air Defence (AAD) / Ashwin Ballistic Missile Interceptor

AAD is a single-stage, solid-fuelled missile with siliconised carbon jet vanes. Guidance is similar to that of PAD with indigenous radio frequency seeker. It supports inertial navigation system (INS), mid-course updates from ground-based radar and active radar homing in the terminal phase. The interceptor and all the elements performed in a copy book fashion validating the endo-atmospheric layer of the defence system. The launch was also shown through a video link at a control room of DRDO Bhawan, at Delhi.
The sequence of events of the test was as follows. At 11 am the Prithvi (missile) lifted off from Launch Complex III at the Integrated Test Range (ITR) at Chandipur, Odisha. Radars at Konark, Paradip detected the missile and were continuously tracking it. The target information was sent to MCC for further processing. The AAD with the help of midcourse updates and its terminal seeker manoeuvres itself towards the target. Radars detected formation of a large number of tracks, signifying that the target had broken into multiple pieces. The thermal cameras located on Wheeler Island also picked up the direct hit through thermal images.

Due to two successful interceptor missile tests carried out by India, the scientists have said that the AAD missile could be modified into a new extended range (up to ) surface-to-air missile that could be possibly named as 'Ashwin'.

On 26 July 2010, AAD was successfully test-fired from the Integrated Test Range (ITR) at Wheeler Island off the Odisha's east coast. 

On 6 March 2011, India launched its indigenously developed interceptor missile from the Odisha coast. India successfully test-fired its interceptor missile which destroyed a 'hostile' target ballistic missile, a modified Prithvi, at an altitude of 16 km over the Bay of Bengal. The interceptor, Advanced Air Defence (AAD) missile positioned at Wheeler Island, about 70 km across sea from Chandipur, received signals from tracking radars installed along the coastline and travelled through the sky at a speed of Mach 5 to destroy it. As the trial was aimed at achieving the desired result with precision, the interceptor missile had its own mobile launcher, secure data link for interception, independent tracking and homing capabilities and sophisticated radars.

"It was a fantastic launch. The trial, conducted from two launch sites of ITR off Orissa coast for developing a full fledged multi-layer Ballistic Missile Defence (BMD) system, was fully successful", he said. On 10 February 2012, AAD was again successfully test-fired from Wheeler Island off the state coast near Dhamra in Bhadrak district, about 170 km from Bhubaneswar.

On 23 November 2012, India again successfully testfired its home-made supersonic Advanced Air Defence (AAD) interceptor missile from a defence base off the coast of the eastern state of Odisha. "The test-firing was part of India's efforts to create a missile defence shield against incoming enemy missiles. The AAD interceptor missile, which was fired from the Wheeler Island off the Odishan coast, successfully destroyed mid-air an incoming ballistic missile launched from the Integrated Test Range in Chandipur, about 70 km from the Wheeler Island."

On 6 April 2015 an improved AAD was tested. The missile was launched from a canister for the first time and the composite rocket motor fired successfully. The missile had improvements over the previous version in terms of bigger warhead, improved maneuverability and reduced mis-distance. As the missile was in the air one of the sub systems malfunctioned making it veer away from the flight path resulting in the failure of the mission. Another test is supposed to take place within 30–45 days after detecting and resolving the problem.

On 22 November 2015 an upgraded version of AAD (Advanced Air Defence) was successfully tested. The anti-ballistic missile took off at 9.40 a.m. from the A.P.J. Abdul Kalam (Wheeler) Island soon after it received the command to waylay and destroy an incoming electronically simulated target missile. Conditions similar to the launch of a target missile from Balasore were simulated electronically and upon receiving its coordinates, the interceptor missile, travelling at supersonic speed, engaged and destroyed the "virtual target" in mid-flight.

On 15 May 2016, DRDO officially reported that AAD intercepted and destroyed a Prithvi ballistic missile fired from a ship.

On 28 December 2017, DRDO successfully carried out AAD missile test in which an incoming modified Prithvi ballistic missile was intercepted and destroyed with a direct hit.

On 3 August 2018, a successful test was carried out from Abdul Kalam Island where one of multiple incoming targets simulating 1,500 km class ballistic missiles was destroyed.

Prithvi Defence Vehicle (PDV)

In 2009, reports emerged of a new exo-atmospheric interceptor missile named the Prithvi Defence Vehicle (PDV) interceptor missile. The DRDO is developing a new Prithvi interceptor missile codenamed PDV. It will be a two-stage missile and both the stages will be powered by solid propellants. It will have an innovative system for controlling the vehicle at an altitude of more than 180 km. The PDV is intended to replace the existing PAD in the PAD/AAD combination. It will have an IIR seeker for its kill vehicle as well. The PDV will replace the PAD with a far more capable missile and will complete the Phase 1 of the BMD system, allowing it to be operational by 2013. Whereupon Phase 2 development will take over for protection against missiles of the  range class. The first test flight of the missile was expected in 2010. The PDV is designed to take out the target missile at altitudes above .

On 27 April 2014 first PDV was successfully test conducted by DRDO. On 11 February 2017, DRDO successfully conducted second test for PDV missile. The third test was conducted on 12 February 2019.

Prithvi Defence Vehicle Mark 2 

In March 2019, India conducted an ASAT test. India officially confirmed that this missile was a Ballistic Missile Defence interceptor. PDV Mk.2 is a 13 m tall, 18.87 tons, three stage missile. Solid rocket motors with flexible nozzles constituted the first two stages, with the Kill Vehicle being the third stage. According to a report published on the official DRDO website, the missile has the capability to shoot down targets moving at 10 km per second in orbits as high as 1,200 km.

It has been suggested that this missile may have the capability of exo-atmospheric interception of Intercontinental ballistic missiles. A report published on the official DRDO website suggests the same. On DefExpo 2020, DRDO confirmed that PDV Mk.2 is ready for limited series production. The solid rocket booster used is a derivative of the technology first developed for Sagarika missile.

Swordfish RADAR

Swordfish is the target acquisition and fire control radar for the BMD system. The DRDO plans to upgrade the capacity of Swordfish to 1,500 km by 2017.

The 1,500 km range upgraded variant called Super Swordfish or Very Long Range Tracking Radar (VLRTR) was raised in 2017 for Indian Ballistic Missile Defence Programme and is now operational.

Deployment
According to scientist V K Saraswat of DRDO the missiles will work in tandem to ensure a hit probability of 99.8 percent. On 6 May 2012, Dr V K Saraswat confirmed that Phase-I is complete and can be deployed to protect two Indian cities at a short notice. He also added that Phase-I is comparable to PAC-3 system.
New Delhi, the national capital, and Mumbai were selected for the ballistic missile defence shield. After successful implementation in Delhi and Mumbai, the system will be used to cover other major cities in the country. When the Phase II is completed and PDV is developed, the two anti-ballistic missiles can intercept targets from up to  both at exo and endo-atmospheric (inside the atmosphere) regions.

In August 2017, the government cleared the allocation of 850 hectares of land in Alwar district and 350 hectares in Pali district of Rajasthan for setting up radars to track missiles to the DRDO.

Cruise missile defence
Defending against an attack by a cruise missile on the other hand is similar to tackling low-flying manned aircraft and hence most methods of aircraft defence can be used for a cruise missile defence system.

In order to ward off the threats of nuke-tipped cruise missile attack India has a new missile defence programme which will be focused solely on intercepting cruise missiles. The technological breakthrough has been created with an Advanced Air Defence missile (AAD).
DRDO Chief, Dr V K Saraswat stated in an Interview "Our studies have indicated that this AAD will be able to handle a cruise missile intercept".

Furthermore, India is acquiring airborne radars like EL/W-2090 AWACS to ensure detection of cruise missiles in order to stay on top of the threat.

Barak-8 is a long-range anti-air and anti-missile naval defence system developed jointly by Israel Aerospace Industries (IAI) and the Defence Research and Development Organisation (DRDO) of India. The Indian Army inducted a variant of Barak 8 missile to meet its requirement for a medium-range surface-to-air air defence missile. The naval version of this missile has the capability to intercept incoming enemy cruise missiles and combat jets targeting its warships at sea. It would also be inducted into the Indian Air Force, followed by the Army. India has a joint venture for this missile with Israel. Recently developed, India's Akash missile defence system also has the capability to "neutralise aerial targets like fighter jets, cruise missiles and air-to-surface missiles".

XRSAM (eXtra-long Range Surface to Air Missile) is an Indian long-range mobile surface to air missile defence system under development by Defence Research and Development Organization (DRDO). The missile system will have a range of 250 km against fighter jets, 350 km against cruise missiles, sea skimming anti-ship missiles, AWACS and mid air refuelers and will be capable of bringing down ballistic missiles and stealth fighters in the terminal stage. The naval version of the missile might be also developed to supplement the LR-SAM missile in the Indian Navy.

On 17 November 2010, in an interview Rafael's Vice President Lova Drori confirmed that the David's Sling system has been offered to the Indian Armed Forces.

Reactions to testing

International 
 – Following the successful test on 15 May 2016, Pakistan on 20 May 2016 voiced concerns over India's test-fire of supersonic interceptor missile and said it would "take all necessary measures to augment the country’s defense capabilities".

 – According to US Deputy Defence Secretary Ashton Carter, there is a potential for co-operation with India to develop a Ballistic Missile Defence (BMD) shield.
"That is an important potential area for our future cooperation", Carter said while on his visit to India in July 2012.

See also

 Anti-ballistic missile
 Integrated Guided Missile Development Programme
 National Missile Defence
 Defence Research and Development Organisation, the organisation involved in the development of the ABM systems.
 Anti-satellite weapon
 Defence Space Agency

References

External links
 Bharat-Rakshak Missile Page
 India to have Ballistic Missile Defence system in place by 2010
 
  – A detailed, but somewhat dated analysis.
 Pradyumna-Ballistic-Missile-Interceptor
 Hat-trick of hits
 DRDO Technology Focus : Warhead for Missiles, Torpedoes and Rockets

Videos
 
 
 Same Video from Youtube
 , News report about the AAD test and comments from Dr. M. Natrajan.
 
  – News Report in Hindi.
 , DD News interview with Dr. V.K. Saraswat

Defence Research and Development Organisation
Missile defense
21st-century surface-to-air missiles
Surface-to-air missiles of India
Anti-ballistic missiles of India